KROW (101.1 FM, "The Krow") is an American radio station licensed to serve Cody, Wyoming, United States. The station, established in 2010, is owned and operated by White Park Broadcasting, Inc. KROW broadcasts an active rock music format.

History
In March 2006, White Park Broadcasting, Inc., applied to the Federal Communications Commission (FCC) for a construction permit for a new broadcast radio station. The FCC granted this permit on June 28, 2006, with a scheduled expiration date of June 28, 2009. The new station was assigned call sign "KWHO" on September 20, 2006.

The station's call sign was changed to "KROW" on January 28, 2010. These call letters were swapped with the sister station now known as "KWHO" (107.1 FM) in Lovell, Wyoming.

After overcoming filed objections and construction and testing were completed, the station was granted its broadcast license by the FCC on August 17, 2011.

Call letters
The call letters KROW were previously assigned to AM stations in San Francisco, California, Reno Nevada, Modesto, California and Dallas, Oregon.

References

External links
KROW official website

ROW
Active rock radio stations in the United States
Radio stations established in 2010
Cody, Wyoming